Testament was an American comic book series written by Douglas Rushkoff with art and covers by Liam Sharp. It was published from February 2006 to March 2008 under DC Comics' Vertigo imprint.

The story takes place simultaneously in the near future and the biblical past to illustrate the most prominent theme: that history repeats itself. This is done by juxtaposing the two timelines, the purpose of which seems to be to illustrate that religion is a continually evolving, living story that is being written by how people, and specifically the protagonists, live their daily lives. Other themes include increasing numbers of fascist governments, human rights, technology, and information economics in the form of a global currency, manna.

Plot 
In the near future grad student Jake Stern and his conscientious objector friends fight against the new RFID-based universal draft by attempting to access the collective unconscious through an experimental combination of the hallucinogenic preparation ayahuasca and shared sensory deprivation tank experiences. The near future story is mirrored through the history-repeats-itself idea as biblical narrative based on Torah, various Jewish and Christian apocrypha, and elements of other mythologies. One major departure from Judeo-Christian tradition in Testament is the separation of The One True God into two entities who in the story are represented by the God Elijah, who represents the Abrahamic One True God, and a new entity of the author's invention which he calls The One True God. Much of the action in the story is driven by situations and characters being manipulated by the various gods as they battle for dominion over existence.

Story arcs
 Abraham of Ur: Issues #1–5
 West of Eden: Issues #6–7
 Down to Egypt: Issues #8–10
 Shit Happens: The Book of Job: Issue #11
 Trip Reset: The Rape of Dinah: Issue #12
 Babel: Issues #13–16
 Blood Brother: Issues #17–18
 Exodus: Issues #19–22

Characters
There are two stories being told, one in the Biblical historical past, the other in the near future.

Biblical characters
 Abraham, patriarch of the Israelite religion
 Astarte, Semitic goddess of fertility, sexuality, and war
 Isaac, Abraham's son, whom he is called on to sacrifice
 Melchizedek Biblical character who appeared to Abraham, here a deity representing the merciful Abrahamic God
 Moloch, Phoenician god of the sacrifice of young children, here a deity representing the malevolent aspects of the Abrahamic God
 Sarah, Abraham's wife

Near-future characters
 Jake Stern, graduate student caught in the middle of the conflict over a near future National RFID Trace system
 Alan Stern, Jake's father, a researcher at Brookhaven National Laboratory (Center For Functional Nanomaterials)
 Amos, leader of Jake's rebel friends at the Temple
 Greco, who makes propaganda for the Temple
 Dinah, Jake's underage friend who makes potions for the Temple
 Other unnamed Temple resident who acts as doorman and wears a "Juan Kerr" shirt
 Miriam, Jake's ex-girlfriend and fellow grad student, dedicated to changing the system using above the board methods
 Alan's colleague Dr. Green, who helped develop the RFID system, originally intended to trace soldiers in the field

Collected editions
The series is being collected into a number of trade paperbacks:

See also
Anakim
Mount Moriah
Sodom
Ur of the Chaldees

Notes

References

External links
Interview: Douglas Rushkoff
Preview

2006 comics debuts
Radio-frequency identification
Science fiction comics
Mythology in DC Comics